The following is a list of episodes of the Kiratto Pri Chan anime television series. The opening and ending themes for season one are "Kiratto Start" and "Pretty☆Channel" for episodes 1–26, "Go! Up! Stardom!" and "KIRA KIRA Hologram" for episodes 27–39, and "never-ending!!" and "SHINING FLOWER" for episodes 40–51. The opening and ending themes for season two are "Diamond Smile" and "Rock Paper Scissors Kiratto! Pri☆Chan" for episodes 52–77 and "Kiralist Jewelist" and "Brand New Girls" for episodes 78–102. The opening and ending themes for season three are "Illuminage Land" and "A・B・C・D・Nice★Dance" for episodes 103–128, "Luminance Princess" for episodes 129–141, and "Dreaming☆Channel" and "One Heart" for episodes 142–152. All season one episode titles end with "Yattemita", while "~damon" is used for season two episode titles. In season three, the episode titles ended with a sentence-ender of a mascot, some of which include "~cchu", "~pan", and "~rabbi".

Season 1

Season 2

Season 3

References

Kiratto Pri Chan